Lot 9 is a township in Prince County, Prince Edward Island, Canada.  It is part of Halifax Parish. Lot 9 was awarded to James Murray in the 1767 land lottery.

Communities

Incorporated municipalities:

 none

Civic address communities:

 Alaska
 Brae
 Carleton
 Coleman
 Derby
 Hebron
 Milburn
 Milo
 Mount Royal

References

09
Geography of Prince County, Prince Edward Island